"International drug convention" could mean any of several international conventions:
 the 1907 International Opium Convention
 the 1925 Agreement concerning the Manufacture of, Internal Trade in and Use of Prepared Opium
 the 1931 Convention for Limiting the Manufacture and Regulating the Distribution of Narcotic Drugs
 the 1931 Agreement for the Control of Opium Smoking in the Far East
 the 1961 Single Convention on Narcotic Drugs
 the 1971 Convention on Psychotropic Substances
 the 1988 United Nations Convention Against Illicit Traffic in Narcotic Drugs and Psychotropic Substances